The Gainsborough line is the current marketing name of the Sudbury branch line, a railway branch line off the Great Eastern Main Line in the east of England, that links  in Essex with  in Suffolk. The line's Engineer's Line Reference is SUD.

Today the line is part of the Network Rail Strategic Route 7, SRS 07.10, and is classified as a rural line. 

As of December 2016 the stations and all trains serving them are operated by Greater Anglia. The typical service frequency is one train per hour in each direction, with a timetabled journey time between one terminus and the other of 19 minutes.

History 

This work was completed in 2007.

In 2006 the line was designated as a community railway by the transport minister and is part of the Essex and South Suffolk Community Rail Partnership.

The current name of the line commemorates the painter Thomas Gainsborough, who was born in Sudbury; the previous name was the Lovejoy line, after the television series Lovejoy, which was filmed in the Sudbury area.

All passenger services on the line are currently operated by Greater Anglia, which runs an hourly service with frequency increasing slightly during peak hours. There are plans to expand more services from Sudbury through to Colchester and  using new bi-mode trains.

Notable sights

Infrastructure
New  bi-mode trains started operating on the line in January 2020.

Stations 

Accidents and incidents 
On 12 July 1887 one person was killed at  when part of a runaway train collided with a crossing gate.
An investigation determined that the driver failed to apply the brakes in a "timely and appropriate manner".
On 17 August 2010 the Little Cornard derailment occurred when the 5:31 pm service from Sudbury collided with a lorry that had entered a level crossing without permission. The train driver and four passengers were seriously injured in the accident.

References

External links
Complete history of the branch line from 1849 Bures web site

Rail transport in Essex
Rail transport in Suffolk
Community railway lines in England
Railway lines in the East of England
Standard gauge railways in England